The 1988 European Curling Championships were held from 6 to 10 December at the Perth Ice Rink arena in Perth, Scotland.

The Scottish men's team skipped by David Smith won their fourth title and the Swedish women's team skipped by Elisabeth Högström won their seventh title.

For the first time, the men's team of Belgium took part in the European Championship.

Men

Teams

First Phase (Triple Knockout)

Round 1
Two teams promoted to Second Phase

Round 2
Three teams promoted to Second Phase

Round 3
Three teams promoted to Second Phase

Second Phase (Double Knockout)

Round 1
Two teams promoted to Playoffs

Round 2
Two teams promoted to Playoffs

Placement Phase

Range 9-14

Range 5-8

Playoffs

Final standings

Women

Teams

First Phase (Triple Knockout)

Round 1
Two teams promoted to Second Phase

Round 2
Three teams promoted to Second Phase

Round 3
Three teams promoted to Second Phase

Second Phase (Double Knockout)

Round 1
Two teams promoted to Playoffs

Round 2
Two teams promoted to Playoffs

Placement Phase

Range 9-12

Range 5-8

Playoffs

Final standings

References

European Curling Championships, 1988
European Curling Championships, 1988
European Curling Championships
International curling competitions hosted by Scotland
December 1988 sports events in the United Kingdom
1988 European Curling Championships